Brijendra Singh (born 13 May 1972) is an Indian politician and Member of Parliament from Hisar parliamentary constituency. 

As a Member of Parliament, he is a Member of the Public Accounts Committee (India), Standing Committee on Defence (India), Joint Committee on the Biological Diversity (Amendment) Bill, 2021 and the Committee on Petitions.

He is a former bureaucrat who took voluntary retirement from the Indian Administrative Service after serving in Haryana for 21 years. He held All India Rank 9 in the Civil Services Examination in the batch of 1998.

Singh completed his BA (Honours) History from St. Stephen's College, Delhi in 1992. He went on to pursue MA in Modern History from Jawaharlal Nehru University. He also holds an MSc in Public Policy and Management from King’s College London.

Singh’s native village falls near Uchana in Jind district, Haryana. He is from the Jat community. He is the son of former Union Steel Minister Birender Singh. Singh’s mother Premlata Singh was a Member of the Legislative Assembly in Haryana representing Uchana Kalan constituency, which was previously held by his father.

References

India MPs 2019–present
Lok Sabha members from Haryana
Living people
Bharatiya Janata Party politicians from Haryana
People from Jind
1972 births